The International School Nido de Aguilas is a private, non-profit co-educational international school in Santiago, Chile. Founded in 1934 as the main international school in Santiago, it provides an English language education to both the city's international community and Chileans. Its student body consists of students from over 50 countries. The school serves students from the age of 3 through 12th grade, and high school students are offered International Baccalaureate courses using a North American-style program. Nido de Aguilas is one of the few schools in Chile that follows a northern hemisphere calendar, with classes running from July to June.

History
Nido de Aguilas was founded in 1934 as a private, co-educational, non-sectarian, non-profit day school rooted in traditions of Chilean and North American education. The school was founded by Dr. Waldo Stevenson and Juanita Stevenson with the aim of providing a high-level education in English coupled with environmental awareness. The campus has been moved three times since the establishment of the school. The first campus was located in the Peñalolén commune of Santiago. The school moved to a second campus in 1949 in what is now known as La Reina. In 1964, after a donation of land and financial contribution from the United States Government, it opened its current location in Lo Barnechea. In 1982, Nido began offering the IB program to students. 6 years later, in 1988, the school switched to a northern hemisphere school calendar.

Governance 
Nido de Aguilas is governed by a board of 9 to 13 directors.  Of these, four must be US citizens, four must be Chileans, and one is an appointee of the US Ambassador.  The Board is self-perpetuating, meaning that vacancies on the Board are elected by the current members of the Board rather than by general elections of the parent community.  The Board has a Nominating Committee that solicits interested members of the school community for possible election to the Board.  Criteria for election to the Board include professional expertise and/or experience that complements the backgrounds of those already on the Board (i.e. finance, legal, engineering, education, business administration, personnel), equitable distribution of members with children at different grade levels throughout the school, and travel and work schedules that enable members to attend regular Board and Committee meetings. Board Members must be parents of currently enrolled students.  Board Members are elected for three years terms and may stand for re-election.  The Board's primary responsibilities are major policy development, financial oversight and approval of the annual budget, and selection and evaluation of the Head of School, who serves as the Chief Executive Officer of the school.

Day-to-day operations within each of the educational subdivisions are the responsibility of the Head of School and the administrative team, who use Board-approved policies to guide administrative decision-making.

Curriculum 
Nido de Aguilas serves just over 1550 students from more than 50 countries and offers a liberal arts, college preparatory educational program from PreKinder (age three) through Grade 12. Nido is the official U.S. State Department Office of Overseas Education School in Chile and serves the international business and diplomatic communities as well as Chileans seeking a North American style of education. 

All classes are taught in English except for Spanish language classes, which are required at all grade levels from Kinder 2 to Grade 12. Nido offers English-language acquisition support for non-native English speakers with limited proficiency, although entrance to Upper Elementary, Middle, and High School grades requires prerequisite levels of English proficiency. The school offers limited learning support for children with learning differences. The High School offers three programs of study: the North American/Nido Diploma, the IB (International Baccalaureate) Diploma, and the Chilean National Diploma (Licencia de Enseñanza Media (Mineduc)). The school provides students with support in the college admissions process.

The academic year comprises two semesters extending from late July to December and mid-February to June. There is a five-week break during June and July, and the Southern Hemisphere summer vacation (semester break) runs from mid-December through mid-February.

Extracurricular activities 
Nido de Aguilas offers different extracurricular activities based on age. Elementary School students are offered roughly 40 after-school activities, including several sports. Middle School students are offered roughly 30 clubs as well as 13 sports. Approximately 40 clubs are offered in High School, as well as baseball, basketball, cross country, two dance teams, field hockey, rugby, soccer, swimming, track & field, volleyball, and water polo teams which compete each year in the South American Athletics Conference (SAAC) tournaments and various local competitions.

Campus 

Nido de Aguilas is located on a 150-acre site in Lo Barnechea, approximately 20 minutes from downtown Santiago. Originally situated well outside the built-up areas of Santiago, it is now surrounded by residential areas.

The Early Years School (Pre-Kinder to Kinder 1), the Elementary School (Kinder 2 to Grade 5), the Middle School (Grades 6 to 8), and the High School (Grades 9 to 12) programs are housed in separate facilities. Each has its own designated staff, including principals, teachers, counselors, and other administrative staff. In addition to classrooms, the campus facilities include two multi-purpose halls, a library/media center, science laboratories, computer labs, a theater/fine arts center (including a 750-seat theater, instrumental music rooms, vocal music rooms, art rooms, and dance studio), two 'MakerSpaces,' counseling and college admissions offices, two cafeterias, a nursing/first aid center, several playground areas, a double-size gymnasium, weight training, and fitness facility, two sports fields, an all-weather track, an outdoor education center, and an indoor aquatics center. The school also has two 'MakerSpaces,' which include 3-D printers, robots, and laser-cutting tools.

See also 
 List of international schools

References

External links
 Official Website
 International Baccalaureate listing
 U.S. Department of State listing

Schools in Santiago Metropolitan Region
International Baccalaureate schools in Chile
International schools in Santiago, Chile
1934 establishments in Chile
Private schools in Chile
American international schools in Chile
Association of American Schools in South America
Educational institutions established in 1934